Pirate Diary: The Journal of Jake Carpenter is an account of the pirate life cast as the journal of a young cabin boy, written by Richard Platt and illustrated by Chris Riddell. It was published by Walker in 2001, two years after Castle Diary, also by Platt and Riddell. Platt continued the "Diary" series with illustrator David Parkins.

Pirate Diary won the annual Kate Greenaway Medal from the professional librarians, recognising the year's best-illustrated children's book published in the U.K. (Riddell),
and the Blue Peter Book Award, Best Book with Facts.
It was also silver runner up for the Nestlé Smarties Book Prize in ages category 6–8 years.

The Greenaway press release celebrated Pirate Diary as an "exciting information book for children from 8 to 14" and the first "information book" to win the illustration Medal since 1975, and called it "a fictionalised account" (quoting CILIP). "[W]hen he spoke with author Richard Platt the harsh necessities of historical accuracy came into play. 'Everything I got excited about got shot down. No parrots, eye-patches or wooden legs. Thank god there were weapons and amputations!'" (quoting Riddell).

Diary series
The Diary series comprises four 64-page picture books that publisher Walker Books labels "Non-Fiction". Author Platt calls them fictional first-person journals (see diary) and calls Castle Diary "my first attempt at fiction".

 Castle Diary: The Journal of Tobias Burgess, Page; Transcribed by Richard Platt, Illustrated by Chris Riddell (Walker, 1999)
 subtitle Journal of a Young Page in the 2011 paperback set
 a boy who goes to work in a castle as a page
Castle Diary was a highly commended runner up for the Greenaway Medal, recognising Riddell's illustration.
 PZ7.P71295 Cas 1999 http://lccn.loc.gov/98042779
  (first US)

 Pirate Diary: The Journal of Jake Carpenter (Walker, 2001)
 subtitle Journal of a Cabin Boy in the 2011 paperback set
 an apprentice sailor, impressed by pirates as a cabin boy
Platt won the Blue Peter Award, Best Book with Facts, and Riddell won the Greenaway Medal for illustration.
 PZ7.P71295 Pi 2001 http://lccn.loc.gov/00065198
  (first US)

 Egyptian Diary: The Journal of Nakht (Walker, 2005)
 subtitle Journal of a Young Scribe in the 2011 paperback set
 the third first-person journal, a whodunit featuring corruption and robbery
 PZ7.P71295 Eg 2005 http://lccn.loc.gov/2005046911
  (first US)

 Roman Diary: The Journal of Iliona of Mytilini, who was captured and sold as a slave in Rome, AD 107 (Walker, 2009)
 subtitle Journal of a Young Slave in the 2011 paperback set
 a Greek girl taken by pirates for sold in Rome; "fourth and final book in the Diary series"
 PZ7.P71295 Rom 2009 http://lccn.loc.gov/2008935660
  (first US)

Walker re-issued all four books March 2011 in a matching set with anonymous subtitles, classified as "Non-Fiction", and recommended for readers age 7 and up.

See also

Notes

References

External links
  —immediately, first US edition 

British children's books
Fictional diaries
Pirate books
Kate Greenaway Medal winning works
Series of children's books
2001 children's books
Children's history books
Walker Books books